ESPN College Football Primetime may refer to one of several shows produced by ESPN:
ESPN College Football Saturday Primetime is the Saturday night game on ESPN.
ESPN2 College Football Saturday Primetime is the Saturday night game on ESPN2.
ESPN College Football Thursday Primetime is the Thursday night game on ESPN
ESPN College Football Friday Primetime is the Friday night game on ESPN2.

 
College Football Primetime